Neuromedin-U receptor 1 is a protein that in humans is encoded by the NMUR1 gene.

See also
 Neuromedin U receptor
 Limostatin

References

Further reading

External links

 
 

G protein-coupled receptors